Capital punishment as a criminal punishment for homosexuality has been implemented by a number of countries in their history. It currently remains a legal punishment in several countries and regions, all of which  have sharia-based criminal laws. Gay people also face extrajudicial killings by state and non-state actors, as in Chechnya in 2019, though it is denied by the Chechen authorities and Russia.

Imposition of the death penalty for homosexuality may be classified as judicial murder of gay people, which has been analyzed as a form of genocide.

In current state laws

As of July 2020, the following jurisdictions prescribe the death penalty for homosexuality:

  Afghanistan. A Penal Code enacted in February 2018 explicitly criminalised same-sex sexual conduct under the Islamic Republic of Afghanistan. Sources cited by the International Lesbian, Gay, Bisexual, Trans and Intersex Association (ILGBTIA) indicated that there was a "broad consensus amongst scholars that execution was the appropriate punishment if homosexual acts could be proven". The sharia category of zina (illicit sexual intercourse), which according to some traditional Islamic legal schools may entail the hadd (sharia-prescribed) punishment of stoning, when strict evidential requirements are met. The Hanafi school, prevalent in Afghanistan, does not regard homosexual acts as a hadd crime, although Afghan judges may have potentially applied the death penalty for a number of reasons. No known death sentences for homosexuality occurred after the end of Taliban rule in 2001. However, following the Taliban takeover of Afghanistan in 2021, fears of reprisal including death for those suspected of homosexuality were renewed. A Taliban spokesman told Reuters in 2021: "LGBT... That's against our Sharia law". A Taliban judge said that "For homosexuals, there can only be two punishments: either stoning, or he must stand behind a wall that will fall down on him".
  Brunei. Sharia Penal Code, Prescribes death by stoning for gay men (temporarily in abeyance), up to 10 years in prison, whippings, and fines.
  Iran. Male-male anal intercourse is declared a capital offense in Iran's Islamic Penal Code, enacted in 1991. Articles 233 through 241 criminalise both female and male same-sex activity; for a first offence, the death penalty only applies to some cases of male-male penile-anal intercourse, with female-female activity and other cases of male-male activity being punished by flogging instead of execution. Under the combination of articles 136 and 238, a woman convicted for the fourth time of the crime of musaheqeh (tribadism) is to be executed; there is no death penalty for non-genital-genital female-female sexual conduct. Though the grounds for execution in Iran are difficult to track, there is evidence that several gay men were executed in 2005–2006, 2016 and in 2022 mostly on alleged charges of rape.
  Mauritania. According to a 1984 law, Muslim men can be stoned for engaging in homosexual sex, though no executions have occurred so far. The country has observed a moratorium on the execution of the death penalty since 1987.
  Nigeria. Several northern states have adopted sharia-based criminal laws, though no executions are known.
  Qatar. Same-sex sexual activity is prohibited under the Penal Code 2004, which criminalises acts of "sodomy" and "sexual intercourse" between people of the same sex. These provisions carry a maximum penalty of seven years' imprisonment. Both men and women are criminalised under this law. Also, the death penalty is applicable only to Muslims, for certain types of extramarital sex regardless of the gender of the participants. However, there is no evidence that the death penalty has been applied for consensual same-sex relations in private taking place between adults.
  Saudi Arabia. Does not have codified criminal laws. According to the country's interpretation of sharia, a married man who commits sodomy, or a non-Muslim who engages in sodomy with a Muslim, can be stoned to death. There are unconfirmed reports that two cross-dressing Pakistani nationals were killed by Saudi authorities in 2017, which Saudi officials have denied. Verified executions occurred in 2019. Homosexuality in Saudi Arabia is proven by four eyewitnesses who have seen the penetration, or a self confession; if these conditions are not met they can't be stoned but can be given discretionary punishments like lashing and jails. 
  Somalia. Insurgents and Somali officials have imposed sharia-based law, mainly in Southern Somalia.
  United Arab Emirates. Article 354 of the Federal Penal Code states: "shall be sentenced to the death penalty, whoever used coercion in having sexual intercourse with a female or sodomy with a male." In addition, same-sex relations fall under the traditional Sharia category of Zina. Some courts have gone beyond codified laws and passed sentences of stoning or flogging, thus making same-sex relationships liable to the death penalty.
  Yemen. Punishment for homosexuality in Yemen can originate from the codified penal code, or from people seeking to enforce traditional Islamic morality. Article 264 of the national penal code prohibits private consensual homosexual acts between adult men. The stipulated punishment in the law for unmarried men is 100 lashes and up to a year in prison. The law stipulates that married men convicted of homosexuality are to be put to death by stoning. Article 268 of the national penal code prohibits private consensual homosexual acts between adult women. The law stipulates that premeditated acts of lesbianism are punished with up to three years in prison. In addition to the penal code, punishment for homosexuality can originate from people seeking to enforce traditional morality within their own family or for the broader society. In vigilante cases such as this, the punishment for homosexuality is oftentimes death.

Extrajudicial killings

In some regions, gay people have been murdered by Islamist militias and terrorist groups, such as Islamic State of Iraq and the Levant in parts of Iraq, Libya, and Syria, the Houthi movement in Yemen and Hamas in the Gaza Strip.

In February 2016 Hamas, which controls the Palestinian National Authority and rules Gaza, executed by firing squad Mahmoud Ishtiwi—one of the group's leading commanders—for homosexual activity.

Anti-gay purges in the Chechen Republic, a predominantly Muslim region of Russia, have included forced disappearances—secret abductions, imprisonment, and torture—by local Chechen authorities targeting persons based on their perceived sexual orientation. Of 100 men, who authorities detained on suspicion of being gay or bisexual, three have reportedly died after being held in what human rights groups and eyewitnesses have called concentration camps.

Extrajudicial killings have occurred in Iraq. Cases include abductions, torture, rape and murder by vigilante mobs, millitia and perpetrators. LGBT people living in fear of their lives, campaigners Human Rights Watch (HRW) and IraQueer found. HRW's LGBT rights researcher Rasha Younes said: "LGBT Iraqis live in constant fear of being hunted down and killed by armed groups with impunity, as well as arrest and violence by Iraqi police, making their lives unliveable."

Report of vigilante executions, attacks, beatings, and torture have been reported in heavily Christian and Muslim regions of Africa, in countries such as Algeria, Uganda, South Africa, Kenya, Liberia, Ghana, Cameroon, and Senegal. In these countries, police turn a blind eye or even are complicit in the anti-gay violence.

History

Australia 
Australian states and territories first passed laws against homosexuality during the colonial era, and nineteenth-century colonial parliaments retained provisions which made homosexual activity a capital offence until 1861. Most jurisdictions removed capital punishment as a sentence for homosexual activity, although in Victoria it remained as such when committed while also inflicting bodily harm or to a person younger than the age of fourteen until 1949. The last person arrested for homosexual sex in Australia was a man in 1984 in Tasmania. The last part of Australia to legalise consensual homosexual sex between adults was Tasmania in 1997. In 2017, same-sex marriage was legalised by the Australian government.

Of the seven men in Australian history known to have been executed for sodomy, six cases involved the sexual abuse of minors; only one of the seven cases was for consensual acts between adults. In that sole case, Alexander Browne was hanged at Sydney on 22 December 1828 for sodomy with his shipmate William Lyster on the whaler Royal Sovereign; Lyster was also convicted and sentenced to death, but his sentence was commuted before execution. Joseph Fogg was hanged at Hobart on 24 February 1830 for an "unnamed crime",  also described in one source as an "abominable crime". The exact nature of his crime is unclear; while likely a same-sex sexual offence given the labels applied ('unnamed', 'abominable'), it too may not have been for consensual acts, but for same-sex rape, or abuse of a minor.

Germany 

During the period of Nazi Germany from 1933 to 1945, homosexual men were persecuted with thousands being imprisoned in concentration camps (and eventually extermination camps) by the Nazi regime. Roughly 5,000–15,000 were sent to the concentration camps, with the death rate being estimated to be as high as 60%. Homosexuals in the camps suffered an unusual degree of cruelty by their captors, including being used as target practice on shooting ranges.

In a 1937 speech, Himmler argued that SS men who had served sentences for homosexuality should be transferred to a concentration camp and shot when trying to escape. This policy was never implemented, and some SS men were acquitted on homosexuality charges despite evidence against them.  A few death sentences against SS men for homosexual acts were pronounced between 1937 and 1940. In a speech on 18 August 1941, Hitler argued that homosexuality should be combatted throughout Nazi organizations and the military. In particular, homosexuality in the Hitler Youth must be punished by death in order to protect youth from being turned into homosexuals, however the Hitler Youth never implemented this policy.

After learning of Hitler's remark, Himmler decided that the SS must be at least as tough on homosexuality and drafted a decree mandating the death penalty to any member of the SS and police found guilty of engaging in a homosexual act. Hitler signed the decree on 15 November 1941 on the condition that there be absolutely no publicity, worried that such a harsh decree might lend fuel to left-wing propaganda that homosexuality was especially prevalent in Germany. Since it could not be published in the SS newspaper, the decree was communicated to SS men one-on-one by their superiors. However, this was not done consistently and many arrested men asserted that they had no knowledge of the decree. 

Even after the decree, only a few death sentences were pronounced. Himmler often commuted the sentence especially if he thought that the accused was not a committed homosexual, but had suffered a one-time mistake (particularly while drunk). Many of those whose sentence was commuted were sent to serve in the Dirlewanger Brigade, a penal unit on the Eastern Front, where most were killed. After late 1943, because of military losses, it was the policy to recycle SS men convicted of homosexuality into the Wehrmacht.

The 1933 law on habitual criminals also allowed for execution after the third conviction. On 4 September 1941 a new law allowed the execution of dangerous sex offenders or habitual criminals when "the protection of the Volksgemeinschaft or the need for just atonement require it". This law enabled authorities to pronounce death sentences against homosexuals, and is known to have been employed in four cases in Austria.  In 1943, Wilhelm Keitel, head of the Oberkommando der Wehrmacht, authorized the death penalty for soldiers convicted of homosexuality in "particularly serious cases". Only a few executions of homosexual Wehrmacht soldiers are known, mostly in conjunction with other charges especially desertion. Some homosexuals were executed at Nazi euthanasia centers, such as Bernburg or Meseritz-Obrawalde. It is difficult to estimate the number of homosexuals directly killed during the Nazi era.

United Kingdom 
From 1533, under the Buggery Act 1533, capital felony for any person to "commit the detestable and abominable vice of buggery with mankind or beast", was enacted, repealed and re-enacted several times by the Crown, until it was reinstated permanently in 1563. Homosexual activity remained a capital offence until 1861. The last execution took place on 27 November 1835 when James Pratt and John Smith were hanged outside Newgate Prison in London.

United States 

During the colonial era of American history, the various European nations which established colonies in the Americas brought their pre-existing laws against homosexuality (which included capital punishment) with them. The establishment of the United States after their victory in the Revolutionary War did not bring about any changes in the status of capital punishment as a sentence for being convicted of homosexual behavior. Beginning in the 19th century, the various state legislatures passed legislation which ended the status of capital punishment being used for those who were convicted of homosexual behavior. South Carolina was the last state, in 1873, to repeal the death penalty for homosexual behaviour from its statute books. The number of times the penalty was carried out is unknown. Records show there were at least two executions, and a number of more convictions with vague labels, such as "crimes against nature".

Sudan 
In July 2020, the sodomy law that previously punished gay men with up to 100 lashes for the first offence, five years in jail for the second and the death penalty the third time around was abolished, with new legislation reducing the penalty to prison terms ranging from five years to life. Sudanese LGBT+ activists hailed the reform as a 'great first step', but said it was not enough yet, and the end goal should be the decriminalisation of same-sex sexual activity altogether.

References

Bibliography

Homosexuality
Criminalization of homosexuality